Italo Bellini (20 July 1915 – 1 January 1993) was an Italian sports shooter. He competed in the trap event at the 1952 Summer Olympics.

References

External links
 

1915 births
1993 deaths
Italian male sport shooters
Olympic shooters of Italy
Shooters at the 1952 Summer Olympics